Shaun Parkes (born 9 February 1973) is an English actor.

Biography
At 16, Parkes enrolled at Seltec College to study drama. Two years later, he was accepted into RADA. Having acted in both theatre and television support roles, Parkes made his breakthrough in the 1999 film Human Traffic. His work since then includes films such as Clubbed, The Mummy Returns, Things to Do Before You're 30 and the acclaimed Notes on a Scandal. Television work includes Lock, Stock..., Servants and Russell T Davies' Casanova and Doctor Who.

Parkes continued to forge a career as a theatre actor. He has starred alongside David Threlfall and Neil Stuke in Joe Penhall's award-winning play Blue/Orange in the West End and in Kwame Kwei-Armah's Elmina's Kitchen and at Shakespeare's Globe as Aaron in Titus Andronicus. Parkes also starred as the lead in BBC Two's detective series Moses Jones, with a supporting cast that included Matt Smith.

Filmography

Theatre appearances
 Digger the Yardie in Elmina's Kitchen (2005)
 Aaron the Moor in the Globe performance of Shakespeare's Titus Andronicus (2006)

Music
Since 2001 Shaun has been collaborating with the DJ production team AudioFly (Anthony Middleton and Luca Saporito). Together they have been working regularly on dance tracks featuring Parkes' vocals, and are planning to produce a new album.

References

External links
Official Site

1973 births
Living people
20th-century English male actors
21st-century English male actors
English male film actors
English male stage actors
English male television actors
Alumni of RADA
Black British male actors
Place of birth missing (living people)
English people of Barbadian descent